The Franklin News Foundation, previously the Franklin Center for Government and Public Integrity, is an online nonprofit news organization in the United States that publishes news and commentary from a free market, limited government perspective on state and local politics. The Franklin New Foundation's journalism platform is called The Center Square.

The Franklin News Foundation's stated mission is "to hold government accountable through objective, balanced, citizen-focused public journalism with a taxpayer sensibility." Chris Krug serves as the organization's president.

History
The Franklin Center was founded in 2009 with an initial sponsorship grant from the Sam Adams Alliance. One of its founders was Jason Stverak, a prior executive director of the North Dakota Republican Party. The organization was originally based in Bismarck, North Dakota, before moving to Alexandria, Virginia. Nicole Neily was appointed the Franklin Center’s president in March 2016. In April 2017, the Franklin Center acquired the non-profit, non-partisan news service Illinois News Network and its associated assets from the Illinois Policy Institute, with INN publisher Chris Krug being named President of the Franklin Center and the headquarters moving to Chicago, Illinois.

News bureaus and affiliates
In September 2009, the Franklin Center launched Watchdog.org, a network of state-based journalists who investigate and report on state and local government. Watchdog.org covers news that involves "public officials, public programs and the taxpayer money that supports them." The Franklin Center is an associate member of the State Policy Network, a consortium of conservative and libertarian think tanks which focus on state-level policy. The Franklin Center partnered with the State Policy Network to help establish news websites and hire reporters in each of the State Policy Network think tanks. Thirty news bureaus were established in the first year and 41 in the second year, almost all in State Policy Network think tanks.

In early 2012, the Franklin Center created a platform for citizen journalism under a banner called Watchdog Wire.

By April 2017, the Franklin Center ran just five news bureaus, in Wisconsin, Vermont, Florida, Mississippi and Arizona, at which point it underwent “reorganization.” In January 2018, Franklin Center President Chris Krug announced that Watchdog.org would be resuming statehouse coverage based upon the Illinois News Network model.

In May 2019, the organization was renamed the Franklin News Foundation, while Watchdog.org and INN's website were replaced with The Center Square. The website's name was chosen to signify a move towards "shorter, more timely and faster-moving content" and away from long-form investigative reporting.

Activities
In the past, the Franklin Center provided training for investigative reporters, state-based news organizations, public-policy institutions, and watchdog groups.

On May 10, 2011, Franklin Center journalist Lynn Campbell of IowaPolitics.com was named moderator for the 2012 Presidential Candidate Series.

In June 2012 the Franklin Center teamed up with the Heritage Foundation to host the first annual Breitbart Awards dinner. The awards honored the life and work of the late Andrew Breitbart who "pioneered a new media revolution that transformed journalism and the political landscape." Syndicated columnist and Fox News Channel contributor Michelle Malkin took home the honors in 2013.

At Conservative Political Action Conference 2013,  Erik Telford of the Franklin Center served on a panel discussing "Current trends in technology." During the two-day conference the Franklin Center ran a promotion using an oversized costume of Ben Franklin meeting and greeting conference participants. Individuals who had their picture taken with the mascot and tweeted the photo received free drink tickets.

Awards and recognition

In November 2010, Franklin Center reporters at Marylandreporter.com and Illinois Statehouse News were honored by the National Association of Capitol Reporters and Editors. MarylandReporter.com editor and publisher Len Lazarick won the first place Cappie award for coverage in the online news category.” The judges also gave Lazarick a third place award in the category "Online: In-depth." Journalist Kevin Lee of Illinois Statehouse News won the Online In-depth Reporting Award for his investigation into the General Assembly Scholarship Program in Illinois.

The Franklin Center's Maryland affiliate, Maryland Reporter, has won awards from the Washington chapter of the Society of Professional Journalists and from CapitolBeat, the national Association of Capitol Reporters and Editors. In 2012, Maryland Reporter was named Maryland's best political website by Baltimore Magazine. Maryland Reporter was also named one of the best state-based political blogs in the nation by the Washington Post.

In August 2011, MarylandReporter.com was awarded a $50,000 grant by the Ethics and Excellence in Journalism Foundation to provide "in-depth coverage of Maryland state government and politics and to expand capacity by giving those who plan on entering journalism as a career real-world experience in investigative reporting supervised by veteran journalists."

Franklin affiliates CapitolBeatOK in Oklahoma, HawaiiReporter.com, and New Jersey Watchdog have been presented awards by the respective state chapters of the Society of Professional Journalists. New Jersey Watchdog has also won two New York Press Club awards.

GreenTech Automotive investigation

The Franklin Center published a series of articles that raised questions about GreenTech Automotive and its presumed chairman, Governor of Virginia Terry McAuliffe. The investigation exposed the company’s reliance on a controversial fundraising program, EB-5, that has been criticized for its lax oversight and subject to abuse. The investigation also revealed that McAuliffe’s public projections, starting back in 2010, of how many cars would be built and jobs created had not come to fruition. In April 2013, it was revealed that McAuliffe had left the green energy car-maker in December of the previous year.

GreenTech Automotive filed an $85 million libel lawsuit against Franklin Center on April 8, 2013 in a Mississippi court. In July 2014, a federal judge in Mississippi dismissed GreenTech's case. GreenTech filed for Chapter 11 bankruptcy in 2018, stating that articles from Watchdog.org “negatively affected governmental, investor and public perception of GreenTech” and led to investigations by the SEC and the Department of Homeland Security. GreenTech also blamed U.S. Sen. Chuck Grassley, who had raised concerns about the company's use of a visa program, among others.

Funding
As of 2012, much of the funding for the Franklin Center came from Donors Trust and Donors Capital Fund, two affiliated donor-advised funds whose funds cannot be traced to individual donors. In 2011, the two funds granted the Franklin Center 6.3 million. The grants were 95% of the Franklin Center’s revenue that year and was the second-largest grant made by Donors Trust that year. In 2012, the two funds granted the Franklin Center nearly 9.5 million, more than 80% of the Franklin Center’s revenue that year. For tax years 2011 through 2013, the Franklin Center received 22 million from the two funds.

References

External links
 
 TheCenterSquare.com
 

American journalism organizations
Non-profit organizations based in Chicago
Investigative journalism
Organizations established in 2009
Conservative organizations in the United States